The A206 road is a road in southeast London and Kent, England.

Length

Purpose of route
Its primary purpose is to link into the London Orbital motorway at the Dartford Crossing and is heavily used by lorries.

Route
It links Greenwich with Greenhithe following the line of the River Thames.

Settlements on route
 Greenwich 
 Charlton 
 Woolwich (with the Woolwich Free Ferry) 
 Plumstead
 West Heath
 Belvedere
 Erith
 Dartford
 Greenhithe.

References

External links

Roads in Kent
Roads in London
Streets in the Royal Borough of Greenwich
Transport in the London Borough of Bexley